The 2020 Bryant Bulldogs football team represented Bryant University in the 2020–21 NCAA Division I FCS football season. They were led by second-year head coach Chris Merritt and played their home games at Beirne Stadium. They played as a member of the Northeast Conference.

Previous season

The Bulldogs finished the 2019 season 4–8, 3–4 in NEC play to finish tied for fourth place.

Schedule
Bryant had games scheduled against Fordham (September 5), Rhode Island (September 12), Brown (September 19), and Robert Morris (November 7), which were later canceled before the start of the 2020 season. Merrimack was added as a replacement for the canceled Robert Morris game on July 15.

References

Bryant
Bryant Bulldogs football seasons
Bryant Bulldogs football